The 1986 World Rowing Championships were World Rowing Championships that were held from 17 to 24 August 1986 at Nottingham in the United Kingdom.

Medal summary
Looking at the open weight classes only, East Germany was the most successful nation (4 gold – 2 silver – 5 bronze) followed by the Soviet Union (3–2–2) and Romania (2–2–1).

Men's events

Women's events

References

Rowing competitions in the United Kingdom
World Rowing Championships
World Rowing Championships
International sports competitions hosted by England
1986 in English sport
Sports competitions in Nottingham
World Rowing Championships
1980s in Nottingham